Anthony Henry (Anton Heinrich) (1734-1800) was a soldier and the King's printer in Halifax, Nova Scotia. He was a fifer for the British  in the Siege of Louisbourg (1758). He later became the publisher of the Halifax Gazette after the death of John Bushell. He opposed the Stamp Act 1765 which he openly criticized and faced charges of sedition for. Henry was also succeeded as government printer for the Nova-Scotia Gazette. He later founded The Nova Scotia Chronicle and Weekly Advertiser, the first Canadian newspaper to run independently of government patronage. He is the namesake and godfather of Anthony Henry Holland.
He was warden of the Little Dutch church. After his death, John Howe (loyalist) became the King's printer.

See also
 Early American publishers and printers
 List of early American publishers and printers

Sources

Citations

External links 
The Nova Scotia Chronicle and Weekly Advertiser at the Nova Scotia Archives.

Canadian publishers (people)
18th-century Canadian newspaper publishers (people)
1734 births
1800 deaths